Malcolm Christian Lang (born 14 January 1941) is an English former professional footballer who played as a winger in the Football League for York City, and in non-League football for Bridlington Trinity.

References

1941 births
Living people
Footballers from Barnsley
English footballers
Association football wingers
Bridlington Trinity F.C. players
York City F.C. players
English Football League players